= Boulder Valley (Nevada) =

Valley in Nevada, United States

Coordinates: 40°34′06″N 114°48′36″W

Boulder Valley is a valley in the U.S. state of Nevada.

Boulder Valley was so named on account of the boulders the valley floor contains.
